Todor Dimitrov Yanchev (born 19 May 1976) is a former Bulgarian footballer , who played as a midfielder.

Career

Playing career
Born in Kazanlak, Yanchev's first club was local club F.C. Rozova Dolina, before he moved to the squads of PFC Neftochimic Burgas.

In the summer break of 2000 CSKA Sofia signed Yanchev. With CSKA he became a champion of Bulgaria for 2003 and 2005. After the end of 2004–05 season, Yanchev transferred to Greek side Kallithea. Year later, as a free agent he signed with Randers, spending one season in Danish Superliga.

In 2007, Todor returned to Bulgaria, to join CSKA Sofia for the second time. In 2008, he became a champion of Bulgaria for third time and won Bulgarian Supercup. In the summer of 2009 he, as well as Kiril Kotev and Yordan Todorov, stayed in the club although the club was facing a big financial crisis, showing very stable level of play proving why he has been the team captain. In 2012 Yanchev was suspended for 3 months after he failed a drug test for methylhexanamine doping.

The defensive midfielder, was one of eight players who was fired by CSKA Sofia on 27 July 2012 and he was appointed for assistant coach, but on 6  August 2012 he was brought back in the first team, because of problem with the registering of the new players. On 20 October 2012 he played for 22nd time in the Eternal derby, wherein CSKA won 1–0.

On 7 January 2013, after leading the team of CSKA to the first official winter training session, Toshko gave his resignation to the Bulgarian Football Union and is no longer a player for CSKA. He decided to leave CSKA Sofia as a show of support for manager Stoycho Mladenov who had been sacked.

On 21 January, it was announced that Yanchev will join Slavia Sofia on a free transfer.

In July of the same year he returned to CSKA Sofia for the third time, after the club changed its ownership.

Managing career
Yanchev was also assistant manager of CSKA Sofia when he played for the team in 2012–13 season and later in 2014–15 season. After he retired in the summer of 2015, he became manager of the newly founded team Tsarsko Selo in the A Regional Group. The team had only wins and one draw in the league, but in the end of December 2015 Tsarsko Selo's owner Stoyne Manolov bought V Group team FC Sofia and from 1 January 2016 Yanchev was appointed as manager in order to save the team from relegation and is looking to manage team in professional football.  On 29 October 2016, following two successive defeats, Yanchev resigned.

Manager statistics

Honours
 CSKA Sofia
Bulgarian A PFG (3)
2002–03, 2004–05, 2007–08
Bulgarian Cup (1)
2010–11
Bulgarian Supercup (2)
2008, 2011

References

External links
 
 

1976 births
Living people
Bulgarian footballers
People from Kazanlak
Bulgarian expatriate footballers
Neftochimic Burgas players
PFC CSKA Sofia players
Trabzonspor footballers
Kallithea F.C. players
Randers FC players
PFC Slavia Sofia players
First Professional Football League (Bulgaria) players
Süper Lig players
Super League Greece players
Danish Superliga players
Association football midfielders
Expatriate footballers in Greece
Expatriate footballers in Turkey
Expatriate men's footballers in Denmark
Doping cases in association football
Bulgarian expatriate sportspeople in Denmark